Lobos BUAP Femenil was a Mexican women's football club based in Puebla. The club has been the female section of Lobos BUAP since 2018. The team plays in the Liga MX Femenil, the top-flight of women's football in Mexico.

The team was founded for the 2018–19 season of the Liga MX Femenil. Being one of the two clubs, with Puebla, that did not field a women's team for the inaugural season of the league.

Players

Current squad
As of 20 January 2019

Management team

References

Association football clubs established in 2018
Women's association football clubs in Mexico